Tandia is a nearly extinct Austronesian language in the putative Cenderawasih (Geelvink Bay) family of Indonesian Papua. Most speakers have shifted to Wandamen. There are only two speakers of Tandia in the world and they both live just south of the Wohsimi River on the Wandamen Peninsula, Irian Jaya Province, Indonesia.

References

South Halmahera–West New Guinea languages
Languages of western New Guinea
Extinct languages of Oceania